Juan Cataldi (born 17 December 1998) is an Argentine professional footballer who plays as an attacking midfielder for Greek Super League 2 club Ierapetra.  

He played his first match in the first division in the Argentine cup and then played matches in the same cup and in the local tournament.  He was part of the team who played the final game against Rosario Central. When he was playing in Bolivar, he played in Copa Libertadores against Palmeiras and another two games in the same Cup. Also he played in Copa Sudamericana.

Career
Cataldi's career started in Gimnasia y Esgrima's system in 2002. He was moved into the club's first-team squad in July 2018, when he was picked to start in Copa Argentina encounters with Sportivo Belgrano and Olimpo; both of which were won 1–0. He made his professional league debut on 18 August during a defeat away to Banfield in the Primera División. He would make a further three appearances in that season for Gimnasia, though wouldn't appear competitively in 2019–20. On 3 August 2020, Cataldi left on loan to Bolivian football with Bolívar. He debuted in the Copa Libertadores versus Palmeiras on 1 October.

Personal life
Cataldi is the nephew of former footballers Guillermo Barros Schelotto and Gustavo Barros Schelotto, while his brothers Salvador and Tomás Cataldi are also footballers; as is his cousin Bautista Barros Schelotto. Cataldi's grandfather Hugo Barros Schelotto was Gimnasia y Esgrima's president during the 1980s.

Career statistics
.

References

External links

1998 births
Living people
Footballers from La Plata
Argentine footballers
Association football midfielders
Argentine expatriate footballers
Expatriate footballers in Bolivia
Argentine expatriate sportspeople in Bolivia
Argentine Primera División players
Club de Gimnasia y Esgrima La Plata footballers
Club Bolívar players
O.F. Ierapetra F.C. players
Barros Schelotto/Cataldi family